Sajan Prakash (born 14 September 1993) is an Indian swimmer who specialises in freestyle, butterfly and medley events. At the 2015 National Games in Kerala, he set a record on 8 February 2015 by winning 6 gold and 3 Silver medals, and became the best athlete of the Indian National Games, held at Trivandrum, Kerala. He competed at the Rio 2016 Summer Olympics in the 200 meter butterfly event. He became the first ever Indian swimmer to breach the FINA "A" Olympic qualification time when he clocked an Indian national record time of 1:56.38 in the 200 m butterfly event at the 2021 Sette Colli Trophy in Rome. With this time he qualified for the 200 m butterfly event at the 2020 Tokyo Olympics. As of June 2021, he is the holder of 11 Indian national swimming records in events spanning freestyle, butterfly, medley and relay categories. Sajan is currently training with Aqua Nation Sports Academy (ANSA) based in Dubai.

Personal life 
Sajan Prakash hails from Idukki district of Kerala. He was raised in Neyveli, Cuddalore district, Tamil Nadu. His mother V.J.Shantymol is also a former athlete and has represented India in several national and international events. He started training at the Neyveli Lignite City Swimming Club, Neyveli, Tamil Nadu. He did his schooling in St. Paul's Matriculation Higher Secondary School, NLC Boys Higher Secondary School, Jawahar Higher Secondary School, Neyveli, Tamil Nadu. He completed his graduation in computer applications from Annamalai University, Chidambaram. Now he joined in Kerala Police as an Officer Commanding . A pool was opened in Neyveli after his name .

Career
In the Sette Colli Trophy in Rome, Sajan Prakash makes history as he became the first Indian swimmer, where he breached the Olympic qualification by just 10 milliseconds in the 200m butterfly event.

He won the gold medal in the men's 200m  butterfly event at the FINA-accredited Olympic Qualifying event.

Olympics

Sajan finished at 28th position in the 200m butterfly event at the 2016 Summer Olympics.

Sajan finished at 24th position in the 200m butterfly event at the 2020 Summer Olympics.

Sajan finished at 46th position in the 100m butterfly event at the 2020 Summer Olympics with a timing of 53:45secs .

Asian Games

At the Asian Games 2018, Prakash participated in 100m and 200m butterfly,  Freestyle Relay, and  Freestyle Relay. Prakash finished at 5th position in 200m Butterfly clocking timing of 1:57.75 and in the  Freestyle relay, he finished at 8th position in the finals.

Commonwealth Games

Prakash finished 8th in the finals of the 200m butterfly event at the Commonwealth Games 2018.

Achievements 
Won gold medal in 100m butterfly stroke and silver medal in 200m freestyle at 36th National Games held in Gujarat.
 Won 6 gold medals and 3 silver medals at the 35th National Games, held in Kerala India and won the Best Athlete award of 2015.
 Only Indian male swimmer to participate at the 2016 Rio Olympics.
 Won a silver medal in the 100m butterfly category at the 2017 Asian Indoor Games, held in Ashgabat, Turkmenistan.
 Holds 10 national, 3 South Asian and 1 Asian records in various categories.
 First Indian swimmer to qualify for finals at the 2018 Asian Games in 200m Butterfly in 32 years.
 First Indian swimmer to breach the FINA "A" Olympic qualification time.
 First Indian Swimmer to qualify for two consecutive Olympics  .

References

External links
 
 
 

1993 births
Living people
Indian male swimmers
Swimmers at the 2016 Summer Olympics
Swimmers at the 2020 Summer Olympics
Olympic swimmers of India
Swimmers at the 2014 Asian Games
Swimmers at the 2018 Asian Games
Commonwealth Games competitors for India
Swimmers at the 2018 Commonwealth Games
Swimmers at the 2022 Commonwealth Games
Swimmers from Kerala
People from Idukki district
Asian Games competitors for India
South Asian Games gold medalists for India
South Asian Games medalists in swimming
20th-century Indian people
21st-century Indian people